LCPD may refer to:

Police departments
 Lake Charles Police Department, Louisiana
 Las Cruces Police Department, New Mexico
 Lake City Police Department, a fictional police department in the American television series T. J. Hooker
 Liberty City Police Department, a fictional portrayal of the New York City Police Department in the Grand Theft Auto video game series

Other uses
 Legg–Calvé–Perthes disease
 Large Combustion Plant Directive